Huan Tan  (BC– AD28) was a Chinese philosopher, poet, and politician of the Western Han and its short-lived interregnum between AD9 and 23, known as the Xin Dynasty.

Life
Huan worked as an official under the administrations of Emperor Ai of Han (.27–1BC), Wang Mang (.AD9–23), the Gengshi Emperor (.23–25), and Emperor Guangwu of Han (.25–57). Huan was a close associate of the court astronomer and mathematician Liu Xin, as well as the author and poet Yang Xiong.

Works
In addition to his many rhapsodies, essays, and memorials, Huan's major work was the Xinlun (新论)or New Discussions, which was admired by Emperor Guangwu despite Huan Tan's besmirched reputation for having closely associated himself with the regime of the usurper Wang Mang. His Xinlun is also the earliest text to describe the trip hammer device powered by hydraulics (i.e., a waterwheel), which was used to pound and decorticate grain.

Legacy
Huan's mode of philosophical thought belonged to an Old Text realist tradition. He drew explicitly on Legalism in his writings on government, saying that in certain historical epochs harsher punishments are needed. He was supported by other contemporaries such as the naturalist and mechanistic philosopher Wang Chong (27–), the latter who Crespigny states was probably heavily influenced by Huan Tan.

Huan Tan is reported by Yu Yingshi (b. 1930) to uphold self-contradictory views on immortality. On one hand, he is quoted to say that "the way of immortals" is a fabrication of the lovers for the strange; on the other, however, he was reported to admit the practice as genuine and efficient. Possible explanation lies in the fact that the Xinlun was a later compilation which might have confused his own statements with the quotations of his opponents.

References

Citations

Bibliography
 .
 .
 .
 .
 .

Further reading
Huan Tan in: Loewe, Michael, A Biographical Dictionary of the Qin, Former Han and Xin Periods (221 BC - AD 24), Leiden (Brill) 2000, pp. 164–165.
"Hsin-Lun (New Treatise) and Other Writings by Huan T'an (43 B.C. - 28 A.D.)" Timoteus Pokora Michigan Papers in Chinese Studies NO.20 1975 Ann Arbor, Center for Chinese Studies The University of Michigan

1st-century BC Chinese poets
1st-century Chinese philosophers
1st-century Chinese poets
Chinese Confucianists
Chinese non-fiction writers
Han dynasty philosophers
Han dynasty poets
Han dynasty politicians from Anhui
Legalism (Chinese philosophy)
Poets from Anhui
Politicians from Huaibei
Philosophers from Anhui
1st-century BC Chinese musicians
1st-century Chinese musicians